The following radio stations broadcast on AM frequency 1674 kHz:

In Australia 
 Radio Haanji in Melbourne, Victoria.
 Radio Haanji in Sydney, New South Wales.

In the  Philippines 
 DZBF in Marikina, Luzon.

References

Lists of radio stations by frequency